Pachyphloeus is a genus of Ascomycete fungi (Pezizales, Pezizaceae) that forms hypogeous fruit bodies, aka truffles.  Pachyphloeus citrinus is known as the "berry truffle" and Pachyphloeus austro-oregonensis is known as the "southern Oregon berry truffle".  The genus Pachyphloeus forms ectomycorrhizal mutualisms with tree roots, usually oaks.  Truffles require animals to dig them up and eat them, in order to disperse their spores.

Species
Pachyphloeus austro-oregonensis
Pachyphloeus carneus
Pachyphloeus citrinus
Pachyphloeus conglomeratus
Pachyphloeus depressus – China
Pachyphloeus lateritius
Pachyphloeus ligericus
Pachyphloeus macrosporus
Pachyphloeus marroninus
Pachyphloeus melanoxanthus
Pachyphloeus prieguensis
Pachyphloeus saccardoi
Pachyphloeus thysellii
Pachyphloeus virescens

References

Pezizaceae
Pezizales genera